The Circle (sometimes called The Circle US to differentiate from other international versions) is an American reality competition series, produced by Studio Lambert and Motion Content Group, that first aired on Netflix in January 2020. It is based on the original British TV series of the same name. Alongside the American version of The Circle, Netflix also launched different versions in France and Brazil, as part of a partnership between Netflix and All3Media. The series bills itself as a game based around social media, with the concept that "anyone can be anyone in The Circle." It has been compared to Big Brother and Catfish in format, as well as Black Mirror episode "Nosedive" with the concept of ratings.

The series was renewed for a fourth and fifth season in August 2021. The fourth season premiered on May 4, 2022, and concluded on May 25. The fifth season, titled The Circle Singles, premiered on December 28, 2022.

Format 
A number of players move into separate apartments within the same building. While playing, contestants are kept isolated from the outside world and each other, and are not allowed to meet or communicate with each other face-to-face. Instead, they communicate via text on a specially-designed social media application that — through photographs, biographies, and text chat — gives them the ability to portray themselves in any way they choose. Players can thus opt to present themselves as a completely different personality to the other players, a tactic otherwise known as catfishing; for example, one male player in the first season presented himself as a female identity, while another female contestant used photos of a woman she felt was more attractive.

Every few days, each contestant must secretly "rate" all of the others from first to last place; their average ratings are then revealed to the entire group from lowest to highest. Normally, the two highest-rated players become "Influencers", while the remaining players are at risk of being eliminated from the game ("blocked") by mutual agreement of the Influencers. Occasionally there may be twists to the blocking process; these include the lowest-rated player(s) being instantly blocked, the identity of the Influencers being a secret, or multiple players being blocked at one time. Blocked players must pack up and leave their apartments immediately, but are given the opportunity to meet and converse with one active player of their choosing in-person. The day after a blocking, a video message is shown to the remaining players to reveal whether the blocked player was real or a "catfish"

Over the first 2/3rds of the season, following most blockings, one or more new players may enter the game. These players typically receive immunity for their first blocking, though they participate in ranking the others, after which they become vulnerable to elimination.

Additionally, viewers are able to vote for their favorite player; the player that receives the most votes is declared "Fan Favorite" and receives .

Episodes

Background

Concept 
Tim Harcourt is the creative director of Studio Lambert, which produces the British and American versions of the show. Harcourt wondered what a reality show would look like if the people never met face-to-face. He had also been considering the idea of a bird's-eye view-style documentary of an apartment building, seeing into each of their lives. He began to work on The Circle after hearing that Channel 4 was looking for a reality-show format centered on social media.

Development 
The British version of the show premiered in 2018, and was renewed for its second season a few months after the first season ended. After the first season was Channel 4's "youngest profiling" show in six years, according to the British TV industry magazine Broadcast, talks began of international versions. On October 8, 2018, Netflix announced its partnership with All3Media to create three international versions of The Circle on Netflix, including the American version. Brandon Reigg, Netflix's Vice Principal of Unscripted Content, stated, "We think the show's combination of modern social media interaction and competition will captivate Netflix members around the world, in multiple languages, and we're delighted to partner with Studio Lambert and Motion to produce these three new local versions."

On March 24, 2020, Netflix renewed The Circle for a second and third season.

Production

The Circle app 
Each apartment that the players live in is plastered with screens in every room in order for the players to be able to hold conversations with other players as they go about their everyday lives. Each player starts out the game by creating a profile. This includes sharing their age, relationship status, a short bio, and one photo to use as their profile picture. Every day, the players are allowed to share a status update, explaining their thoughts for the day. Sometimes, either through rewards or passing a certain milestone, the players are allowed to upload another photo to their profile. Throughout the competition the Circle app remains the only way players can communicate with each other.

During a typical episode, the Circle prompts participation in a minigame. Tim Harcourt of Studio Lambert says that "some games were really good for bonding them, some were really good for them learning about each other, some were good for testing who's a catfish, some could have been more divisive."

Most episodes also  included a rating exercise. Each player would rank others in The Circle, then an average score would  determine the overall placements of each player. Depending on how high or low their average placement was, the player's ranking would determine whether they became an influencer. Typically the two players with the top rankings would be Influencers, with  the advantage of determining the player being eliminated, or "blocked."

Apartment building 
The Circle US was shot entirely in the same apartment building in Salford, England, as the other international versions except for the first series of the original UK show. The apartment building is always prepared with twelve furnished and ready-to-use apartments for the players to live in. The building also has an exercise room and a rooftop lounge, which are also outfitted with cameras and television screens. One room in the building, called "the testimonial room," is the room players go to after they are blocked to create their goodbye video to the remaining players. On the outside of the building is a large, lit up circle made of a roughly 82-foot (25-meter) diameter aluminum track with LED lights strung through and around the circle.

Opposite the apartment building was the control room, which was previously a college campus that became disused. At any time in the control room, there were between twenty and thirty producers and camera operators working, recording, and sending all the messages from The Circle.

References

External links
 
 @thecirclenetflix on Instagram

2020 American television series debuts
2020s American reality television series
American television series based on British television series
English-language Netflix original programming
The Circle (franchise)
Television series about social media
Television series by All3Media